The United Kingdom Pavilion is a British-themed pavilion that is part of the World Showcase, within Epcot at Walt Disney World near Orlando, Florida, United States. The pavilion represents the four countries of the United Kingdom; England, Scotland, Wales and Northern Ireland. It is located between the France and Canada pavilions.

Layout

The United Kingdom Pavilion, designed to look like a stereotypical British village, has English gardens including a hedge maze and a band stand.

The shops sell British items such as tea, biscuits, toys, clothing, sports apparel and Beatles merchandise.

A set of iconic Gilbert-Scott telephone boxes line a rose garden near the pavilion's restrooms, and often there is a direct connection on these phones to a similar box in the Canada pavilion nearby.

A band called the British Revolution perform British rock music covers from acts such as the Police, the Rolling Stones, the Beatles, Blur, and Led Zeppelin. A comedic group, known as the World Showcase Players, used to perform humorous and interactive versions of "King Arthur and the Holy Grail" and "Romeo and Juliet" (renamed "Romeo and Edna").

Attractions and services

Current Attractions 
 DuckTales World Showcase Adventure (2022-Present)

Upcoming Attractions
 unnamed Mary Poppins attraction and Cherry Tree Lane expansion (TBD)

Former Attractions
 Kim Possible World Showcase Adventure (2009 - 2012)
Agent P's World Showcase Adventure (2012 - 2020)

Dining

Rose & Crown Pub & Dining Room houses both a British-style pub, serving British (and some European and domestic) brews, and a dining room that is both indoor and outdoor. There is a piano player indoors, and outdoors the fireworks show IllumiNations: Reflections of Earth can be viewed. Dishes offered include scotch egg, shepherd's pie, corned beef and fish and chips. For dessert, the Rose & Crown offers Jaffa Cakes, banoffee pie, and rhubarb tart. Beers and ciders offered at the pub include (from Britain and Ireland). The pub also offers a number of cocktails and blends.
 Yorkshire County Fish Shop

A quick-service fish and chip counter restaurant serving only fish, chips, and shortbread. Drinks, including Bass Ale and Harp Lager, are available. Seating is outdoors only.

Shopping
 The Toy Soldier
Sells toys and memorabilia usually associated with the UK, such as: the Beatles, Paddington Bear, Doctor Who, Sherlock, Winnie the Pooh and the Rolling Stones. There are also traditional wooden toys as well as Disney merchandise.
 The Crown and Crest
Sells Keep Calm and Carry On merchandise, including, books, shirts, cups, and mugs.
 HRC
The Historical Research Center sells coats-of-arms, swords, and other merchandise and lets you look at the history of your last name.
 Sportsman's Shoppe
Sells football team apparel from various teams, and books. This shop also sells Guinness merchandise.
 The Tea Caddy
Sells Twinings tea, teacups, teapots, and British confectionery
 UK Cart
Sells Walt Disney World trading pins, lanyards, Minnie and Mickey Mouse plush toys, shot glasses, and UK shirts.

Entertainment
 British Revolution - band playing British rock music from the 1960s through 1990s

Former 
 The Hat Lady - piano player in the Rose & Crown
 World Showcase Players - roving comedy show- CLOSED 2014

Meet Disney characters from the films
Throughout the day, characters from British-based Disney features appear such as 
Mary Poppins
Alice and the Mad Hatter
 Winnie the Pooh and Friends
 Peter Pan, Wendy and Tinkerbell
 Merida

Gallery

References

External links

 Walt Disney World Resort - United Kingdom Pavilion
 Walt Disney World Resort - Rose & Crown Pub & Dining Room
 Walt Disney World Resort - British Revolution

Walt Disney Parks and Resorts attractions
Epcot
World Showcase
British-American culture in Florida
1982 establishments in Florida